Solenopsis silvestrii is a fire ant species in the family Formicidae.

References

silvestrii
Insects described in 1906